Bearfoot may refer to:

Bearfoot (Canadian band)
Bearfoot (American band)
Bear Foot (truck), a monster truck